Bendigo Airport may refer to:

Bendigo Airport (Victoria) in Bendigo, Victoria, Australia
Bendigo Airport (Pennsylvania) in Tower City, Pennsylvania, United States